Chima Ihekwoaba (born November 3, 1988) is a former professional Canadian football defensive end for the Montreal Alouettes of the Canadian Football League. He was drafted 14th overall by the Alouettes in the 2010 CFL Draft and signed with the team after spending time with the NFL's Detroit Lions. He played college football for the Wilfrid Laurier Golden Hawks.

Professional career

Detroit Lions
Ihekwoaba signed with the Detroit Lions on May 2, 2010, on the same day that he was drafted 14th overall by the Alouettes in the CFL Draft. He was released by the Lions at the end of the NFL's preseason on August 30, 2010.

Montreal Alouettes
On September 15, 2010, it was announced that Ihekwoaba had signed a contract with the Montreal Alouettes.

External links
Just Sports Stats
Montreal Alouettes bio

References

1988 births
Living people
Montreal Alouettes players
Canadian football defensive linemen
Wilfrid Laurier Golden Hawks football players